is the seventh single by Japanese girl group Melon Kinenbi. It was released on October 23, 2002, and its highest position on the Oricon weekly chart was #12.

Track listing

External links
Kōsui at the Up-Front Works release list (Zetima) (Japanese)

2002 singles
Zetima Records singles
Juice=Juice songs